Karvan District is a district (bakhsh) in Tiran and Karvan County, Isfahan province, Iran. At the 2006 census, its population was 31,126, in 8,395 families.  The district has one city: Asgaran. The district has two rural districts (dehestan): Karvan-e Olya Rural District and Karvan-e Sofla Rural District.

References 

Tiran and Karvan County
Districts of Isfahan Province